I'm Not Jesus Mommy, also called Devil's Angel, is a preternatural thriller motion picture. The film is an interpretation of the Book of Revelation and the End Times and centers around a secret human cloning project which attempts to reproduce the  Second Coming of Christ, but the child is born without a soul and is, instead, the Antichrist.

Plot
This sci-fi thriller concerns Dr. Kimberly Gabriel (Bridget McGrath), a seemingly infertile young woman who will do virtually anything in her power to conceive a child. Through the miracle of modern science, she inherits a cloned son named David (Rocko Hale). For a time, all appears well, until David reaches his seventh birthday, and disasters suddenly begin to plague the earth—disasters that seem to be emanating from the young boy himself. Dr. Roger Gibson (Charles Hubbell) turns up and admits a long-buried secret: the DNA used to clone David came from the Shroud of Turin, the clean linen cloth in which Joseph of Arimathea wrapped the body of Jesus Christ that bears His image.

Cast
 Bridget McGrath (Credited also Shar Stephanie) as Dr. Kimberly Gabriel
 Charles Hubbell as Dr. Roger Gibson
 Rocco Hale as David
 Joseph Andrew Schneider as Bruce

Distribution
I'm Not Jesus Mommy had its premiere at the Twin Cities Film Festival September 30, 2010. It began its theatrical release from May 6, 2011, through May 13, 2011 in multiple theaters in the Minneapolis Saint Paul Metropolitan area. It also screened at the 2011 Los Angeles Film Festival.

The film was released in North America Video on Demand on January 1, 2012, by Gravitas Ventures and on DVD in 2012 by Maverick Entertainment Group.

Reception 
Chris Hewitt of the St. Paul Pioneer Press said, "Juares is nothing if not ambitious, and he assembles the pieces of the puzzle with clarity (he also edited and photographed the film). But he bites off more than he can chew..."

References

External links
 I'm Not Jesus Mommy (2011) Theatrical Film Trailer

2011 films
American science fiction horror films
Fictional depictions of the Antichrist
2010s American films